Roger Pusey is a former BBC Radio 1 producer who worked on the Peel Sessions. He was previously producer of the station's Tony Blackburn morning show.

He produced versions of a number of tracks for The Smiths including "This Charming Man", "What Difference Does It Make", and "This Night Has Opened My Eyes" on the compilation albums: Hatful of Hollow and Louder Than Bombs.

In addition, Pusey produced tracks for David Bowie and New Model Army.

In 2010 he co-produced the debut EP Atlas by singer-songwriter Joshua Fisher.

References

External links
 Roger Pusey on Discogs.com

Year of birth missing (living people)
Living people
BBC radio producers
English radio producers
English record producers
Musicians from London